There were several special elections to the United States House of Representatives in 1945 during the 79th Congress.

79th Congress 

|-
| 
| Dave E. Satterfield Jr.
|  | Democratic
| 1937 
|  | Incumbent resigned.New member elected March 6, 1945.Democratic hold.
| nowrap | 

|-
| 
| James F. O'Connor
|  | Republican
| 1936
|  | Incumbent died January 15, 1945.New member elected June 5, 1945.Republican gain.
| nowrap | 

|-
| 
| James V. Heidinger
|  | Republican
| 1940
|  | Incumbent died in office.New member elected November 6, 1945.Republican hold.
| 

|}

References 

 
United States home front during World War II
1945